Elkanah Tisdale (1768 – May 1, 1835) was an American engraver, miniature painter and cartoonist. He was known for the famous cartoon "The Gerry-Mander", published in the Boston Gazette on March 26, 1812, which led to the coining of the term gerrymandering.

Biography
Elkanah Tisdale was born in 1768 in Lebanon, Connecticut.
His father ran a wagon shop in Lebanon before moving to New York City in 1794, and Elkanah probably worked for him as a carriage painter.    
Tisdale was based in New York from 1794 to 1798, where he described himself as "Engraver and miniature painter".
After 1798 he called himself a miniature painter. Some sources say that he met Benjamin Trott in 1798, and the two friends left New York and stayed in Albany for a few months to avoid an epidemic of yellow fever. From that time he alternated between Connecticut and New York City.

In 1798 he founded the Hartford Engraving Company in Hartford, Connecticut.
He joined the Graphic Co. in Hartford, an association of engravers, though he designed vignettes but did not engrave them. 
He probably met and taught the future miniaturist Anson Dickinson in the early 1800s.
From 1813 to 1818 he worked in Boston. In 1818 he exhibited two miniatures at the New York American Academy of the Fine Arts. 
He moved to Hartford in 1818.
In 1820 he was designing and engraving plates for Samuel F. Goodrich in Hartford.
He returned to Lebanon around 1823.
His engraving of the Convention at Philadelphia appeared in an 1823 edition of A History of the United States. 
He died in 1835 in Norwich, Connecticut.

Work
Some of Tisdale's earliest works were his full-page illustrations in John Trumbull's McFingal, which was published in New York in 1795.
According to David McNeely Stauffer in his American Engravers on Copper and Steel, "Tisdale worked in both line and stipple; but his plates possess little merit ... Tisdale was a better designer than engraver, and he claimed to be a painter in his early life, though his best work was in the line of miniature portrait painting."

Notes and references
Notes

Citations

Sources

1768 births
1835 deaths
American engravers
American cartoonists
18th-century American painters
18th-century American male artists
American male painters
19th-century American painters
Portrait miniaturists
People from Lebanon, Connecticut
Artists from Connecticut
Gerrymandering in the United States
19th-century American male artists